Trigonoorda gavisalis is a moth in the family Crambidae. It was described by Francis Walker in 1869. It is found in Australia, where it has been recorded from New South Wales and Queensland.

References

Moths described in 1869
Odontiinae